The 2015-16 Swiss Challenge League, known for sponsorship reasons as the Brack.ch Challenge League, was the 13th season of the Swiss Challenge League, the second tier in the Swiss football pyramid. It began on 18 July 2015 and ended on 27 May 2016. After the 18th matchday the league will be on winter break between 7 December 2015 and 6 February 2016.

Participating teams 
2014–15 Swiss Challenge League champions FC Lugano were promoted to the 2015–16 Swiss Super League. They were replaced by FC Aarau, who were relegated after last place finish in the 2014–15 Swiss Super League. Last placed team of the 2014–15 Challenge League season FC Biel-Bienne were spared from relegation as Servette FC failed to obtain a license for the 2015-16 season and were relegated to the 1. Liga Promotion. Servette were replaced by 1. Liga Promotion champion Neuchâtel Xamax.

Stadia and locations

Personnel and kits

Managerial changes

League table

Results

First and Second Round

Third and Fourth Round

Season statistics

Top scorers

References

External links
 
Soccerway

Swiss Challenge League
2015–16 in Swiss football
Swiss Challenge League seasons